This article is a list of diseases of beets (Beta vulgaris), a plant grown for its edible taproot and leaves.

Bacterial  diseases

Fungal diseases

Nematodes, parasitic

Viral diseases

Phytoplasmal and sprioplasmal diseases

Miscellaneous diseases and disorders

References
Common Names of Diseases, The American Phytopathological Society
Beet Diseases (Fact Sheets and Information Bulletins), The Cornell Plant Pathology Vegetable Disease Web Page

Beet